Cui Ren (born 19 January 1989 in Yanji) is a Chinese former footballer who played as a midfielder.

Club career
Cui Ren was promoted to China League One side Yanbian FC in 2007. On 29 March 2009, he made his senior debut in a 2–1 away defeat against Shanghai East Asia. On 26 September 2009, he scored his first senior goal in a 3–1 away defeat against Sichuan FC. Cui was linked with another League One club Qingdao Hainiu by the end of 2013 season; however, Yanbian refused his transfer request.

On 9 February 2015, Cui moved to Chinese Super League side Shanghai Shenxin on a free transfer. He made his Super League debut on 15 March 2015, in the second match of the season against Shanghai SIPG, coming on as a substitute for Everton.

On 1 January 2016, Cui returned to Yanbian after Shanghai Shenxin's relegation. He transferred to China League One side Zhejiang Greentown on 1 March 2019 after Yanbian Funde was disqualified for the 2019 season due to owing taxes. He would make his debut for Zhejiang in a league game on 10 March 2019 against Qingdao Huanghai in a 2-1 defeat. After three seasons with the club he would aid them to promotion to the top tier at the end of the 2021 campaign. Cui retired from professional football at the end of the 2021 season after being unable to recover from a cruciate ligament tear and cartilage damage.

Career statistics 
Statistics accurate as of match played 27 April 2022.

References

External links
 

1989 births
Living people
People from Yanbian
Chinese footballers
Footballers from Jilin
Chinese people of Korean descent
Yanbian Funde F.C. players
Shanghai Shenxin F.C. players
Zhejiang Professional F.C. players
Chinese Super League players
China League One players
Association football midfielders